The Daimler D.IIIb was a V-8, water-cooled,  piston engine developed in Germany by Daimler Motoren Gesellschaft, for use in aircraft in 1918.

Design and development
Little is known of the Daimler D.IIIb, (not related to the Mercedes D.III), other than it was used for a succession of Daimler fighter prototypes in 1918.

Applications
Data from:The Complete Book of Fighters & German Aircraft of the First World War
 Daimler L6
 Daimler L8
 Daimler L9
 Daimler L11
 Daimler L14
 Daimler D.I
 Daimler CL.I

Specifications (Daimler D.IIIb)

See also

Notes

Bibliography

1910s aircraft piston engines